Launched in 2014, Justice Centre Hong Kong is an independent, non-profit human rights organisation that focuses on the protection of refugees and asylum seekers in Hong Kong. Hong Kong has long been a hub of migration and refuge due to wars in the region and Hong Kong’s historical role as a trading and transit entrepôt. There were estimated to be 14,000 refugees in the territory in 2017, and these refugees are in need of extensive legal assistance as the 0.8 substantiation rate is extremely low compared to rates of 25-62% per cent in other developed jurisdictions. Before early 2014 the organisation was known as the Hong Kong Refugee Advice Centre (HKRAC), which in 2007 had grown out of the Refugee Advice Unit  from another local organisation working with refugees, Christian Action. And spun off by human rights lawyers Jennifer Stone and Raquel Amador, who were the first Directors. In 2012 Aleta Miller became Executive Director, helping HKRAC win the Clifford Chance Foundation Access to Justice Award in 2012, and relaunching the organisation as Justice Centre Hong Kong in 2014. From 2015 the Executive Director was Piya Muqit, who was previously head of policy and advocacy at UNICEF UK. In November 2020 Melanie McLaren was appointed Executive Director.

The organisation works with civil society partners to champion the rights of persons seeking protection in Hong Kong through research and advocacy work. In addition, it provides legal and psychosocial assistance to asylum seekers, as with the very low acceptance rate of legal aid applications in Hong Kong most asylum seekers are otherwise forced to represent themselves. 

They also carry out evidence based policy work to try to influence and improve government policies towards their clients. Their 'Coming Clean" report in 2016 found more than 80 percent of the territory's 336,600 domestic workers are exploited, with one in six a victim of forced labour. Providing the first quantitative data on trafficking this gave Hong Kong a very low ranking on the Global Slavery Index, and pushing Hong Kong onto the Tier 2 Watch List of the US State Department’s Trafficking in Persons report.

Reference

External links 
 Official website

Human rights organisations based in Hong Kong
Human rights in Hong Kong
Organizations established in 2007
Hong Kong
Hong Kong